Acta Neurochirurgica is a monthly peer-reviewed medical journal covering all aspects of neurosurgery. It was established in 1950 and is published by Springer Science+Business Media. The editor-in-chief is T. Mathiesen (University of Copenhagen).

Abstracting and indexing
The journal is abstracted and indexed in:

According to the Journal Citation Reports, the journal has a 2020 impact factor of 2.216.

References

External links

Surgery journals
Neurology journals
Monthly journals
Springer Science+Business Media academic journals
Publications established in 1950
English-language journals